Nine is a 1973 album by the British folk rock group Fairport Convention. It is their ninth album since their debut in 1968, and the second to include Trevor Lucas and Jerry Donahue. No original members of Fairport Convention were involved in making the album.  According to AllMusic, it is the band's most uneven album.

"Polly on the Shore" was re-recorded by the 21st-century lineup of Fairport Convention (using only Dave Pegg from the Nine-era lineup) for their album Sense of Occasion in 2007, with Simon Nicol on lead vocals. The same lineup later re-recorded "The Hexhamshire Lass" in a new arrangement for 2012's By Popular Request. This version featured Chris Leslie on lead vocals.

Track listing

Side one
"The Hexhamshire Lass" (Traditional; arranged by Fairport Convention) – 2:31
"Polly on the Shore" (Music: Pegg, Words: Traditional; arranged by Swarbrick, Lucas) – 4:56
"The Brilliancy Medley/Cherokee Shuffle" (Traditional) – 3:56
"To Althea, from Prison" (Words: Richard Lovelace; Music: Dave Swarbrick) – 5:10
"Tokyo" (Donahue) – 2:52

Side two
"Bring 'Em Down" (Lucas) – 5:59
"Big William" (Lucas, Swarbrick) – 3:25
"Pleasure and Pain" (Lucas, Swarbrick) – 5:03
"Possibly Parsons Green" (Lucas, Roche) – 4:42

Bonus tracks on CD reissue
"The Devil in the Kitchen" (Fiddlestix) – 2:49
"George Jackson" (Live) – 2:49
"Pleasure and Pain" (Live) – 4:59
"Six Days on the Road" (Live) – 3:44
Bonus tracks recorded live at The Howff, London on April 23, 1973.

Personnel
Fairport Convention
Trevor Lucas - acoustic guitar, lead vocals (2, 6, 9), chorus (8), backing vocals
Dave Swarbrick - violin, lead vocals (1, 4, 7), verse (8) and backing vocals, viola, mandolin (7)
Jerry Donahue - acoustic and electric guitars
Dave Pegg - bass, backing vocals, mandolin (3)
Dave Mattacks - drums, percussion, bass (3), harmonium (4), clavinet (5)

References

Fairport Convention albums
1973 albums
Albums produced by John Wood (record producer)
Island Records albums
A&M Records albums